Comet Lake is a private reservoir in Summit County, Ohio located within the city of Green, at .  The community of Comet sits on the northwestern end of the lake.  The lake drains over the Comet Lake Dam into the upper Tuscarawas River by way of Nimisila Creek.

References

Summit County, Ohio
Reservoirs in Ohio